Mulgoa is an electoral district of the Legislative Assembly in the Australian state of New South Wales. It is currently represented by Tanya Davies of the Liberal Party.

Mulgoa includes the suburbs of Abbotsbury, Austral, Badgerys Creek, Cecil Hills, Cecil Park, Eastern Creek, Elizabeth Hills, Erskine Park, Glenmore Park, Horsley Park, Kemps Creek, Luddenham, Middleton Grange, Mount Vernon, Mulgoa, Orchard Hills, Regentville, St Clair, Wallacia and West Hoxton.

Mulgoa was originally created 1988, but was abolished in 1991, when it was largely replaced by Badgerys Creek. It was recreated in 1999, largely replacing Badgerys Creek. As a result of a redistribution in 2021, Mulgoa will once again be abolished at the 2023 election, replaced by a new incarnation of Badgerys Creek.

Members for Mulgoa

Election results

References

Mulgoa
Mulgoa
1988 establishments in Australia
Mulgoa
1991 disestablishments in Australia
Mulgoa
1999 establishments in Australia